Dominique Mortemousque (2 June 1950 – 7 May 2022) was a French politician. He was a member of the Union for a Popular Movement and later The Republicans.

Biography
A farmer by profession, Mortemousque served as mayor of Nojals-et-Clotte from 1995 to 2008. In 2002, he succeeded Xavier Darcos in the Senate, representing Dordogne. In March 2008, he was elected mayor of Beaumont-du-Périgord. He was defeated in the 2008 French Senate election by Claude Bérit-Débat of the Socialist Party.

He was re-elected as mayor of Beaumont-du-Périgord in 2014. He was defeated in his 2015 bid to represent the Canton of Lalinde in the Departmental Council of Dordogne. On 1 January 2016, four communes were merged to form Beaumontois-en-Périgord, of which he served as the first mayor.

Mortemousque died in Périgueux on 7 May 2022, at the age of 71.

References

1950 births
2022 deaths
French farmers
20th-century French politicians
21st-century French politicians
French Senators of the Fifth Republic
Departmental councillors (France)
Senators of Dordogne
Mayors of places in Nouvelle-Aquitaine
Union for a Popular Movement politicians
The Republicans (France) politicians
20th-century farmers
21st-century farmers